Charles Brantley Aycock is a bronze sculpture depicting the American politician of the same name by Charles Keck, installed in the United States Capitol's crypt as part of the National Statuary Hall Collection. The statue was gifted by the U.S. state of North Carolina in 1932.

However, on February 28, 2018, the governor of North Carolina requested from the Architect of the Capitol replacement of the statue with one of evangelist Billy Graham, pursuant to legislation signed in 2015.  The statue will be replaced once sufficient private funds are raised for Graham's statue.

See also

 1932 in art

References

External links
 

1932 establishments in Washington, D.C.
1932 sculptures
Bronze sculptures in Washington, D.C.
Aycock
Monuments and memorials in Washington, D.C.
Aycock
Sculptures by Charles Keck
Sculptures of men in Washington, D.C.